Töbank (full name Türkiye Öğretmenler Bankası) was a former Turkish bank.

It was founded on 22 May 1958 in Ankara. Its main shareholders were 21,000 teachers. The name of the banks means "Teachers' Bank of Turkey". In 1985 headquarter of the bank was moved to İstanbul. On 22 May 1992 it was merged with Halkbank, a Turkish public bank.

Töbank camp
Töbank owned a holiday camp in Kumkuyu town of Mersin Province. After the merger, the camp was bought by the provident fund of Töbank employees. On 5 March 2011 the fund sold the camp to a private tourism company.

References

Banks established in 1958
Banks disestablished in 1992
Defunct banks of Turkey
1992 disestablishments in Turkey
Turkish companies established in 1958